"La La La (If I Had You)" is a song by Bobby Sherman released in November 1969. Written by Danny Janssen (who had written Sherman's previous single, Little Woman), the song spent 11 weeks on the Billboard Hot 100 chart, peaking at No. 9, while reaching No. 14 on Billboards Easy Listening chart. In Canada, the song reached No. 7 on the "RPM 100", No. 15 on RPMs adult contemporary chart, and No. 16 on Toronto's CHUM 30 chart.  The song earned Sherman a gold record.

Chart performance

References

1969 songs
1969 singles
Bobby Sherman songs